Robert De Niro Jr. is an American actor, director and producer. His early films included Greetings (1968),  (1969), Bloody Mama (1970), Hi, Mom! (1970), Jennifer on My Mind (1971),  (1971), and Mean Streets (1973). His performance in the film led him to win the Academy Award for Best Actor in a Supporting Role. After The Godfather Part II, he starred in Martin Scorsese's psychological drama Taxi Driver (1976). In the film, De Niro portrayed Travis Bickle, who is a lonely, depressed 26-year-old living in isolation in New York City. He won the Los Angeles Film Critics Association Award for Best Actor, National Society of Film Critics Award for Best Actor, New York Film Critics Circle Award for Best Actor, and he was nominated for the Academy Award for Best Actor. De Niro's "You talkin' to me?" dialogue was ranked number 10 on the American Film Institute's AFI's 100 Years... 100 Movie Quotes. In 1978, De Niro appeared in Michael Cimino's war drama The Deer Hunter, a film based on a trio of steelworkers whose lives were changed forever after fighting in the Vietnam War. De Niro was nominated for the Academy Award for Best Actor.

After Taxi Driver, De Niro collaborated with Scorsese on musical drama New York, New York (1977). The film was a box-office failure, and the disappointing reception drove Scorsese into depression and drugs. While Scorsese was in rehab, De Niro asked him to read Raging Bull: My Story, a book about the boxer Jake LaMotta, which Scorsese threw away and said was "full of shit". After nearly dying from a drug overdose, Scorsese agreed to make the film. Raging Bull (1980) received widespread critical acclaim, and De Niro received the Academy Award for Best Actor, Golden Globe Award for Best Actor – Motion Picture Drama, and the National Board of Review Award for Best Actor. After Raging Bull, De Niro appeared in neo-noir True Confessions (1981), in which he was praised for his performance. In 1983, De Niro was cast in Martin Scorsese's satirical black comedy The King of Comedy, in which he appeared as a struggling comedian with mental health issues. While the film bombed at the box office, it was well received by critics. Mark Kermode of The Guardian wrote, "While all these movies are terrific indeed, they pale by comparison with Scorsese and De Niro's finest – and most often overlooked – work: The King of Comedy". The following year, De Niro appeared in epic crime drama Once Upon a Time in America. In the film, De Niro plays David "Noodles" Aaronson, who struggles as a street kid in a neighborhood on Manhattan's Lower East Side in the 1920s. Once Upon a Time in America was a financial disaster, grossing $5.3 million on a $30 million budget.

In 1990, De Niro starred in Penny Marshall's Awakenings, based on Oliver Sacks's 1973 memoir of the same title and for his performance he was nominated for the Academy Award for Best Actor. The following year, De Niro appeared in Scorsese's psychological thriller Cape Fear as Max Cady, a convicted rapist. He was nominated for the Academy Award for Best Actor for his performance. In 2000, De Niro appeared in the comedy film Meet the Parents, which was a commercial success, later reprising his role in the 2004 and 2010 sequels. In 2012, De Niro appeared in the David O. Russell film Silver Linings Playbook, for which he received an Academy Award for Best Supporting Actor nomination. In 2019, De Niro starred in Todd Phillips' psychological thriller Joker, film based on DC Comics characters. In the film, De Niro plays Murray Franklin, a talk show host. The film grossed over $1 billion, making it the first R-rated film to do so. After Joker, De Niro collaborated with Martin Scorsese on The Irishman (2019). In the film, he plays the role of Frank "The Irishman" Sheeran, a truck driver who becomes a hitman involved with mobster Russell Bufalino and his crime family. De Niro's performance in the film was widely praised by critics.

Films

Documentary and short films

As producer only

Television

Theatre

References

External links
 

De Niro, Robert
Filmography
De Niro, Robert